Alison Murray may refer to:
 Alison Murray (director), Canadian director of films, documentaries and music videos
 Alison Murray (author), Scottish children's author and illustrator
 Alison Murray (scientist), American microbial ecologist and Antarctic researcher